Gwen Stefani's You Make It Feel Like Christmas is a Christmas television special that aired on December 12, 2017, in the United States on NBC.

Production 
On October 6, 2017, Stefani released her fourth studio album, You Make It Feel Like Christmas, a collection of classic Christmas songs and newly-recorded tracks, through her record label Interscope. Following her appearance on Today on November 20, Stefani discussed her upcoming television special titled Gwen Stefani's You Make It Feel Like Christmas.

See also 
 List of United States Christmas television specials

References 

2010s American television specials
2017 television specials
Christmas television specials
Gwen Stefani
NBC television specials
American Christmas television specials